

Released films
The following is a list of films produced in the Kannada film industry in India in 1997, presented in alphabetical order.

See also 

 Kannada films of 1996
 Kannada films of 1998

References

External links
 Kannada Movies of 1997 at the Internet Movie Database

1997
Kannada
 Kannada
1997 in Indian cinema